Law Society of Yukon is the regulatory body for lawyers in the Yukon.

Founded in 1971 as Yukon Bar Association following the emergence of reforms that lead to the establishment of elected government and legislative council, it was renamed as the Law Society in 1985.

Past Society Members

The body's first president was Erik Nielsen, who later became a federal MP and cabinet minister including time as Deputy Prime Minister of Canada.

References

Yukon
Yukon law
1971 establishments in Canada
Organizations established in 1971
Organizations based in Yukon
Whitehorse